Lung Tin Tsuen is a village in the Shap Pat Heung area of Yuen Long District, Hong Kong

Administration
Lung Tin Tsuen is a recognized village under the New Territories Small House Policy.

Education
Lung Tin Tsuen is in Primary One Admission (POA) School Net 73. Within the school net are multiple aided schools (operated independently but funded with government money) and one government school: South Yuen Long Government Primary School (南元朗官立小學).

References

External links

 Delineation of area of existing village Lung Tin (Shap Pat Heung) for election of resident representative (2019 to 2022)

Villages in Yuen Long District, Hong Kong
Shap Pat Heung